Magic Wonderland (Chinese: 魔幻仙踪) is a 2014 Chinese animated fantasy adventure film directed by Wu Jianrong and Fang Lei.

Plot
A baby princess named Ocean is sent away from the North Pole by her mother because of the tyranny of the magma dragon who controls the volcano. The next twelve years, Princess Ocean lives on a local island and encounters a transforming polar bear whom she names Roly Poly. And she talks to a duo of little fish. While encountering the pirates, she meets an inventor named Momo. Their plan is to subdue and defeat the magma dragon.

Cast

English version
Lucy Liu as Princess Ocean
Grey DeLisle as Little Roly Poly
Denis Leary as Big Roly Poly

Chinese version
Lucy Liu
Yi Yi
Ge Yuying
Yang Ying
Ling Juan
Zhang Lu

Related TV series
This contains the following episodes:

Season 1
The Birth of the Magic Globe
The Winner of the Fish Race
The Magic Amulet
The Pirates
The Escape
Ocean's Footprints
Lurking Danger
Life on the Pirate Ship
The Secret Plan
Mysteries
Castaway
Mystika - The Dangerous One
The Journey to the Celestial City
Season 2
The Unexpected Happens
The Darkest Day
Danger Awaits
The Maze
Malcolm the Giant Child
The Mysterious Trench
A LIght in the Dark
Malcolm Takes on the Demon
The Lost Dragon
The Snail Fields
The Gate at the Center of the Earth
A Strong Enemy
The Wonderland

Reception
The film has grossed US$3.06 million at the Chinese box office.

References

2010s fantasy adventure films
Chinese fantasy adventure films
2014 animated films
2014 films
Animated adventure films
Chinese animated fantasy films